Donis Salatiel Escober Izaguirre (born 3 February 1981) is a Honduran retired football goalkeeper.

Club career
Born in San Ignacio, Escober started at Olimpia's youth side Juventud Olímpica and has played his entire professional career for Olimpia.

In March 2012, Escober was on the verge of breaking Motagua's Nicaraguan goalkeeper Róger Mayorga's 36 years old-record of 838 minutes without conceding a goal in the Honduran league. He did not make it in the end, after being beaten by a Marathón goal that left Escober only 35 minutes short of Mayorga's record. After the 2018–19 Liga Nacional de Honduras came to an end, Escober announced that he would not continue with Olimpia and that he would retire from football.

International career
Escober made his debut for Honduras in a May 2002 friendly match against Japan and has, as of January 2013, earned a total of 17 caps. He has represented his country in 2 FIFA World Cup qualification matches and played at the 2003 and 2007 UNCAF Nations Cups as well as at the 2009 and was a non-playing squad member at the 2011 CONCACAF Gold Cup and the 2010 FIFA World Cup in South Africa. He played in the 2018 CONCACAF-AFC playoff against Australia in both legs, but failed to qualify for the 2018 FIFA World Cup with Honduras.

He has been an understudy to Noel Valladares for most of his international career.

References

External links

 World Cup profile - FIFA

1981 births
Living people
People from Francisco Morazán Department
Association football goalkeepers
Honduran footballers
Honduras international footballers
2003 UNCAF Nations Cup players
2007 UNCAF Nations Cup players
2009 CONCACAF Gold Cup players
2010 FIFA World Cup players
2011 CONCACAF Gold Cup players
2013 Copa Centroamericana players
2013 CONCACAF Gold Cup players
2014 FIFA World Cup players
2015 CONCACAF Gold Cup players
2017 Copa Centroamericana players
2017 CONCACAF Gold Cup players
C.D. Olimpia players
Liga Nacional de Fútbol Profesional de Honduras players
Copa Centroamericana-winning players